An incomplete list of films produced in Brazil in the 1960s. For an A-Z list of films currently on Wikipedia see :Category:Brazilian films

External links
  Brazilian film at the Internet Movie Database

1960s
Brazilian
Films